Cyperus bonariensis is a species of flowering plant in the family Cyperaceae, native to Venezuela and two groups of offshore Caribbean islands, the Netherlands Antilles and the Venezuelan Antilles. It was first described by Gordon C. Tucker in 2013.

References

bonariensis
Flora of the Dutch Caribbean
Flora of the Netherlands Antilles
Flora of the Venezuelan Antilles
Flora of Venezuela
Plants described in 2013
Flora without expected TNC conservation status